Baron Rivers was a title that was created four times in British history, twice in the Peerage of England, once in the Peerage of Great Britain and once in the Peerage of the United Kingdom.

History
The first creation came in 1299 when John Rivers was summoned to Parliament as Baron Rivers. The title became extinct on the death of the second Baron in circa 1340.

The second creation came in 1448 when Richard Woodville, father of Elizabeth Woodville (queen of England), received the title. It was later subsumed when Woodville became Earl Rivers in 1466. Both titles became extinct on the death of the third earl in 1491.

The third creation came in 1776 when George Pitt was made Baron Rivers, of Strathfield-Say in the County of Southampton, in the Peerage of Great Britain. He was a descendant of John Pitt (16th century), the father of Thomas Pitt, ancestor of the Earls of Londonderry, Barons Camelford and Earls of Chatham, and of Sir William Pitt, whose grandson George Pitt married the daughter of the 2nd Earl Rivers. George Pitt's eldest son and namesake was the aforementioned George Pitt, who was elevated to the peerage in 1776. In 1802 Lord Rivers was created Baron Rivers, of Sudeley Castle in the County of Gloucester, with remainder to 1) his brother General Sir William Augustus Pitt and the heirs male of his body, and 2) William Horace Beckford (son of Peter Beckford of Stapleton in Dorset by his wife Louisa, daughter of Lord Rivers) and the heirs male of his body. This title was in the Peerage of the United Kingdom.

He was succeeded in both baronies by his son, the second Baron. He had previously represented Dorset in Parliament. He sold part of the family estates, those around Stratfield Saye House to the nation in about 1814, so that it could be given to Arthur Wellesley, 1st Duke of Wellington. On his death in 1829 the barony of 1776 became extinct while he was succeeded in the barony of 1802 according to the special remainder to his nephew William Beckford, the third Baron. He was the son of the aforementioned Peter Beckford and Louisa Pitt. He assumed at the same time by Royal licence the surname of Pitt-Rivers in lieu of his patronymic. The fourth Baron held political office as a Lord-in-waiting from 1853 to 1858 and 1859 to 1866. The title became extinct on the death of the sixth Baron in 1880.

List of titleholders

Baron Rivers; First creation (1299)
John Rivers, 1st Baron Rivers (d. c. 1311)
John Rivers, 2nd Baron Rivers (d. c. 1340)

Baron Rivers; Second creation (1448)
 Richard Woodville, 1st Baron Rivers. Created Earl Rivers in 1466; extinct on death of 3rd earl and baron in 1491.

Baron Rivers; Third creation (1776)
George Pitt, 1st Baron Rivers (1721–1803) (created Baron Rivers again in 1802; see below)
George Pitt, 2nd Baron Rivers (1751–1828)

Baron Rivers; Fourth creation (1802)
George Pitt, 1st Baron Rivers (1721–1803)
George Pitt, 2nd Baron Rivers (1751–1828)
William Horace Pitt-Rivers, 3rd Baron Rivers (1777–1831)
George Pitt-Rivers, 4th Baron Rivers (1810–1866)
George Horace Pitt (1834–1850)
Granville Beckford Pitt (1838–1855)
William Frederick Pitt (1845–1859)
Henry Peter Pitt-Rivers, 5th Baron Rivers (1849–1867)
Horace Pitt-Rivers, 6th Baron Rivers (1814–1880)

See also
Earl Rivers
Earl of Londonderry
Earl of Chatham
Baron Camelford

References

1299 establishments in England
Extinct baronies in the Peerage of England
Extinct baronies in the Peerage of Great Britain
Extinct baronies in the Peerage of the United Kingdom
Peerages created with special remainders
Noble titles created in 1299
Noble titles created in 1448
Noble titles created in 1776
Noble titles created in 1802